Siddiq (meaning "truthful") is an Islamic term and is given as an honorific title to certain individuals. The feminine gender for Siddiq is Siddiqah.  The word is sometimes used as a title given to individuals by the Islamic prophet Muhammad. For example, it was a title of Abu Bakr, the first Islamic caliph from 632 to 634. Otherwise, it is used to denote that the person is totally trustworthy.

Sunni usage
Sunni Muslims use Siddiq as an epithet for Abu Bakr, the first Caliph of Islam and the closest friend of Muhammad, while they use Siddiqah for Aisha, Abu Bakr's daughter and the Prophet's wife.

Sufi term
In Sufism, Siddiq is a rank that comes after prophet. It is generally given to a person who verified the claim of prophethood in its early stage.  Sufis believe the following four ranks are free of time and space and therefore life and death becomes meaningless to them. 

Nabi – Prophet, someone who learned of the unseen from God directly
Siddiq – Early day Muslim who learned the unseen from Muhammad
Shaheed – Martyr, someone who gave their life for the will of God and has thus become beyond mortality.
Salih – Righteous, someone who spends every bit of their life per the will of God and thus achieved the status of "Baqaa" through Fanaa.  Also referred to as Wali.
These four ranks are mentioned in the Quran.

Shia usage
Shi'a Muslims use Siddiqah as a title for Muhammed's daughter Fatima. In Then I was Guided, the Shi'a author asks its Sunni audience how it is possible for both Abu Bakr and Fatimah to be "Siddiq", when contemplating their intense and deep conflicts, implying that logic demands one to be a liar, and arguing it can not be Muhammed's daughter.(note: sunnis interpret all of that text as some differences that arose between prophet haroon a.s and prophet musa a.s and both were siddiq and nabi at the same time) The Sunni view is that Muhammad daughter Fatimah is sidiqqa.

Other usage 
In Hebrew the word/name "Tzadik" (צדיק), has a similar meaning. The title of Voltaire's satirical novella Zadig also stems from this name root.

See also
 Rabbani
 Siddiqui
 Qallu
 Tzadik

References 

Islamic terminology
Islamic culture
Surnames